China SCE Property Holdings Limited is a privately held property developer headquartered in Xiamen, Fujian, China. It primarily focuses on high-end residential property development in the Western Taiwan Strait Economic Zone, including the greater metropolitan areas of Xiamen, Quanzhou and Zhangzhou, and Fuzhou.

It was listed on the Hong Kong Stock Exchange in 2010 with the IPO price of HK$2.6 per share.

References

External links
China SCE Property Holdings Limited

Real estate companies of China
Companies based in Xiamen
Real estate companies established in 1995
Privately held companies of China
Companies listed on the Hong Kong Stock Exchange